Live à Paris is the third home video by Canadian singer Celine Dion, released on VHS on 8 November 1996 and on DVD on 17 November 2003. It was recorded live at the renowned Zénith Paris in Paris, France, in October 1995 before an audience of over 6,000 fans, during the D'eux Tour.

Background
Live à Paris contains songs from the highly successful French language album D'eux, along with few English-language hits. Jean-Jacques Goldman joined Dion on "Les derniers seront les premiers" and "J'irai où tu iras".

The VHS was certified 3× Platinum in France (60,000). The DVD re-release was counted separately in France and certified Platinum (20,000).

Live à Paris CD is also available. It was released on 22 October 1996 and features 14 out of 19 tracks performed during the concert.

Track listing

Charts

Weekly charts

Year-end charts

Certifications

!colspan=3|VHS
|-

!colspan=3|DVD
|-

Release history

References

1996 video albums
Celine Dion video albums
Live video albums